José Luis Cisnero (born April 11, 1989) is a Dominican-American professional baseball pitcher for the Detroit Tigers of Major League Baseball (MLB). He has also played in MLB for the Houston Astros.

Career

Houston Astros
Cisnero signed with the Houston Astros as an international free agent on December 6, 2007, and was added to their 40-man roster on November 20, 2012. He made his major league debut on April 22, 2013. In parts of two seasons for the Astros, he made 33 relief appearances, posting a 4.66 ERA with 46 strikeouts in  innings. He was outrighted off the roster on November 3, 2014, and subsequently became a free agent.

Cincinnati Reds
On November 18, 2014, Cisnero signed a minor league deal with the Cincinnati Reds. Cisnero sat out the 2015 season due to Tommy John surgery. He elected free agency on November 6, 2015.

Arizona Diamondbacks
On December 21, 2015, Cisnero signed a minor league deal with the Arizona Diamondbacks organization . He was released on March 31, 2016, after failing to make the team in Spring Training.

Sultanes de Monterrey
On May 3, 2016, Cisnero signed with the Sultanes de Monterrey of the Mexican Baseball League. He was released on May 30, 2016.

New Jersey Jackals
On July 12, 2016, he signed with the New Jersey Jackals of the Can-Am League. He came out of the bullpen in 5 games and posted a 3.86 ERA before his release on July 25.

Detroit Tigers
On November 9, 2018, the Detroit Tigers signed Cisnero to a minor league contract with an invitation to spring training. He opened the 2019 season with the Toledo Mud Hens. On June 22, 2019, his contract was selected by the Tigers. He made his Tigers debut the next day, marking his first major league appearance in over five years. He finished the season with a 4.33 ERA in 35 games, and struck out 40 batters in  innings.

With the 2020 Detroit Tigers, Cisnero appeared in 29 games, compiling a 3–3 record with a 3.03 ERA and 34 strikeouts in  innings pitched.

On January 15, 2021, the Tigers and Cisnero agreed on a one-year, $970,000 contract, avoiding arbitration. Cisnero pitched mostly in a setup role for the 2021 Tigers, making occasional appearances as a closer. On September 13, he suffered an elbow laceration after slipping on stairs at his residence, requiring eight stitches. The Tigers placed him on the 10-day injured list September 14, and he did not return for the remainder of the season. In 2021, Cisnero made 67 relief appearances, posting a 4–4 record, 4 saves, and a 3.65 ERA, with 62 strikeouts in  innings.

On March 23, 2022, the Tigers and Cisnero agreed on a one-year contract worth $1.9 million, avoiding arbitration. On April 6, the Tigers placed Cisnero on the 60-day injured list with a right shoulder strain. The Tigers activated Cisnero on July 21, and he made his 2022 debut that evening against the Oakland Athletics. Cisnero pitched in 28 games for the 2022 Tigers, all in middle relief, posting a 1.08 ERA and 23 strikeouts in 25 innings.

On January 13, 2023, Cisnero agreed to a one-year, $2.2875 million contract with the Tigers, avoiding salary arbitration.

Pitch selection
Cisnero throws both four-seam and sinking two-seam fastballs, each averaging 95 to 97 MPH (topping out at 100 MPH). His main offspeed pitch is a slider that averages 86 to 89 MPH. He also throws an occasional changeup averaging 89 to 90 MPH.

References

External links

1989 births
Living people
Cardenales de Lara players
Corpus Christi Hooks players
Detroit Tigers players
Dominican Republic expatriate baseball players in Mexico
Dominican Republic expatriate baseball players in the United States
Dominican Summer League Astros players
Leones del Escogido players
Gigantes del Cibao players
Greeneville Astros players
Houston Astros players
Lancaster JetHawks players
Lexington Legends players
Major League Baseball pitchers
Major League Baseball players from the Dominican Republic
Mexican League baseball pitchers
New Jersey Jackals players
Oklahoma City RedHawks players
Pensacola Blue Wahoos players
People from Bajos de Haina
Sultanes de Monterrey players
Toledo Mud Hens players
Dominican Republic expatriate baseball players in Venezuela